Nostima picta is a species of shore flies in the family Ephydridae.

Distribution
Europe, Canada, United States.

References

Ephydridae
Insects described in 1913
Diptera of North America
Diptera of Europe
Taxa named by Carl Fredrik Fallén